The men's artistic individual all-around competition at the 1952 Summer Olympics was held at Messuhalli, Exhibition Hall I from 19 to 21 July. It was the eleventh appearance of the event. There were 185 competitors from 29 nations. Each nation entered a team of between five and eight gymnasts or up to three individual gymnasts. The event was won by Viktor Chukarin of the Soviet Union, with his countryman Hrant Shahinyan taking silver. It was the Soviet debut in the event, beginning four decades of dominance rivalled only by Japan and ending only after the dissolution of the Soviet Union; the Soviets would win 6 of the 10 editions from 1952 to 1988 (and the Unified Team would sweep the medals in 1992), with Japan taking the other 4. Bronze in 1952 went to Josef Stalder of Switzerland (the nation's third consecutive Games on the podium); it was the last medal in the men's all-around for any gymnast not from the Soviet Union or Japan until 1980.

Background
This was the 11th appearance of the men's individual all-around. The first individual all-around competition had been held in 1900, after the 1896 competitions featured only individual apparatus events. A men's individual all-around has been held every Games since 1900.

Seven of the top 11 gymnasts (including a tie for 10th place) from the 1948 Games returned: bronze medalist Paavo Aaltonen of Finland, fourth-place finisher Josef Stalder of Switzerland, seventh-place finisher Zdeněk Růžička of Czechoslovakia, eighth-place finisher Kalevi Laitinen of Finland, ninth-place finisher Guido Figone of Italy, and tenth-place finishers Olavi Rove of Finland and Lajos Tóth of Hungary. The 1936 gold medalist Alfred Schwarzmann (who was unable to defend his title in 1948 due to Germany not being invited to the London Games following World War II) also returned. The top two finishers at the 1950 World Championships (Switzerland's Walter Lehmann and Marcel Adatte) did not compete in Helsinki; Rove, at third place, was the highest finisher from the World Championships to compete in 1952.

India, Poland, Portugal, Saar, South Africa, the Soviet Union, Spain, and Sweden each made their debut in the event. Italy made its 10th appearance, most among nations, having missed only the 1904 Games in St. Louis.

Competition format

The gymnastics format continued to use the aggregation format. All entrants in the gymnastics competitions performed both a compulsory exercise and a voluntary exercise for each apparatus. The 12 exercise scores were summed to give a total. No separate finals were contested.

For each exercise, four judges gave scores from 0 to 10 in one-tenth point increments. The top and bottom scores were discarded and the remaining two scores averaged to give the exercise total. Thus, exercise scores ranged from 0 to 10, apparatus scores from 0 to 20, and individual totals from 0 to 120.

For the vault, each competitor had two tries for each of the compulsory and voluntary vaults with the better score to count. For the other four (non-floor) apparatus exercises, the competitor had the option to make a second try only on the compulsory exercise—with the second attempt counting regardless of whether it was better than the first. For both compulsory and voluntary floor exercises, and voluntary exercises in the non-floor, non-vault apparatuses, only one attempt could be made.

Schedule

All times are Eastern European Summer Time (UTC+3)

Results

References

Men's artistic individual all-around
1952
Men's events at the 1952 Summer Olympics